Galway Lake is located west of Galway (village), New York, in the town of Galway in Saratoga County, New York, United States.

The lake was first constructed in 1855 to serve as a reservoir for the nearby City of Amsterdam, and was owned by the Amsterdam Water Works Company. Galway Lake was enlarged by the creation of the Galway Lake Dam on North Chuctanunda Creek in Saratoga County, New York, once used to power various mills and industries along the creek, and is now used solely for recreation purposes. Construction of the current Galway Lake Dam was completed in 1982, after the camper association purchased it from the Amsterdam Water Works Company for $1. It is property of Galway Lake Campers Association.

The Lake is located at latitude - longitude coordinates (also known as lat-long or GPS coordinates) of N 43.02619 and W -74.08291. Galway Lake is shown in the center of the topographic (topo) map, which is sourced from the United States Geographical Survey map USGS Galway quad.

See also
 List of lakes in New York

References

External links
 Mapquest: Galway Lake Location
 Galway Lake Association

Protected areas of Saratoga County, New York
Reservoirs in New York (state)
Reservoirs in Saratoga County, New York